Fred Marriott (14 February 1886 – 13 May 1954) was an Australian rules footballer who played with Carlton in the Victorian Football League (VFL).

Notes

External links 

	
Fred Marriott's profile at Blueseum

1886 births
Australian rules footballers from Melbourne
Carlton Football Club players
1954 deaths
People from Malvern, Victoria